Niagara West—Glanbrook was a federal electoral district in Ontario, Canada, that existed from 2004 to 2015.

The riding was created in 2003 from parts of Ancaster—Dundas—Flamborough—Aldershot,
Erie—Lincoln, Hamilton Mountain, Niagara Centre, and Stoney Creek.

It consisted of the towns of Grimsby, Lincoln and Pelham, the Township of West Lincoln, and the part of the City of Hamilton lying east and south of a line drawn from the southern city limit north along Glancaster Road, east along the hydroelectric transmission line situated south of Rymal Road West, north along Glover Road, Anchor Road, Arbour Road and Mountain Brow Boulevard and east along Redhill Creek and the Niagara Escarpment to the eastern city limit.

Following the 2015 redistribution, the portion of the Niagara West—Glanbrook riding within the Niagara Region formed the new riding of Niagara West.  The portions of Niagara-West Glanbrook in the City of Hamilton formed part of the new riding of Flamborough—Glanbrook.

The riding was represented for the entire period of its existence by Conservative Dean Allison.

Electoral district

Member of Parliament

Election results

		

|- bgcolor="white"

		

Change is redistributed from 2000 results. Conservative change is from a combination of Canadian Alliance and Progressive Conservative votes.

See also
 List of Canadian federal electoral districts
 Past Canadian electoral districts

References

Riding history from the Library of Parliament
 2011 results from Elections Canada
 Campaign expense data from Elections Canada

Notes

Former federal electoral districts of Ontario
Grimsby, Ontario
Politics of Hamilton, Ontario
Politics of the Regional Municipality of Niagara